The 2017 season will be Stabæk's fourth season back in the Eliteserien following their relegation in 2012, their 21st season in the top flight of Norwegian football. Stabæk finished the previous season in fourteenth place and survived the relegation play-offs against FK Jerv.

Squad

Out on loan

Transfers

Winter

In:

Out:

Summer

In:

Out:

Competitions

Eliteserien

Results summary

Results by round

Results

Table

Norwegian Cup

Squad statistics

Appearances and goals

|-
|colspan="14"|Players away from Stabæk on loan:
|-
|colspan="14"|Players who left Stabæk during the season:

|}

Goal scorers

Disciplinary record

References

Stabæk Fotball seasons
Stabæk